The Gilman-Hayden House is a historic house at 1871 Main Street in East Hartford, Connecticut.  Built in 1784, it is a good local example of Georgian architecture, and is also notable as the home of Edward Hayden, a diarist of the American Civil War.  It was listed on the National Register of Historic Places in 1984.

Description and history
The Gilman-Hayden House is located on a rural-residential stretch of East Hartford's Main Street, between Gilman and King Streets.  It is a -story wood-frame structure, with a side-gable roof and clapboarded exterior.  Its main facade faces east and is five bays wide, with a center entrance sheltered by a gabled portico.  A two-story ell extends to the rear, and an enclosed porch projects to the south.  The interior of the house follows a typical center-hall plan, with two rooms on either side of the hall on both floors.  The interior retains many original period features, including bead-board paneling, built-in cupboards, and wrought iron hardware.  The two front parlor spaces feature fine fireplace surrounds.

The house was built in 1784 by George Gilman, a descendant of some of the area's earliest settlers.  The Gilmans originally owned land all the way to the Connecticut River, and operated a ferry.  In the second quarter of the 19th century the property came into the hands of the Williams family, whose most famous member was William Williams, a signatory of the United States Declaration of Independence.  In 1867, the house was purchased by Edward Hayden, whose mother was a Williams.  Hayden is most notable for the unique diary he kept of his experiences during and after the American Civil War.  One portion of the diary was written on a similar diary Hayden recovered from a Confederate Army soldier, and provides a unique window into the affairs of the war.

See also
National Register of Historic Places listings in Hartford County, Connecticut

References

Houses on the National Register of Historic Places in Connecticut
National Register of Historic Places in Hartford County, Connecticut
Georgian architecture in Connecticut
Houses completed in 1784
Houses in Hartford County, Connecticut
East Hartford, Connecticut